The Division of Forrest is an Australian Electoral Division in Western Australia.

Geography
Since 1984, federal electoral division boundaries in Australia have been determined at redistributions by a redistribution committee appointed by the Australian Electoral Commission. Redistributions occur for the boundaries of divisions in a particular state, and they occur every seven years, or sooner if a state's representation entitlement changes or when divisions of a state are malapportioned.

History

The division was created in 1922 and is named for Sir John Forrest, the first Premier of Western Australia and a federal Cabinet minister. It is located in the South West region of the state and, as of the 2022 election, includes the Cities of Bunbury and Busselton along with the Shires of Augusta-Margaret River, Capel, Dardanup, Donnybrook-Balingup, and Harvey. The Shire of Nannup was previously part of the seat, but was transferred to the neighbouring electorate of O'Connor following a 2021 redistribution.

Before the 1943 election, it was a Country Party seat, but since the 1949 election it has been held by the Liberals for all but one term. Labor has only held the seat for three terms, during the high-tide elections of 1943 and 1946, and in the midst of the Coalition's near-defeat of 1969. It reverted to the Liberals in 1972 even as Labor won government. The seat was marginal for most of the 1980s, but a 1990 redistribution made the seat much more secure for the Liberals. In 2022, amidst a statewide collapse of Liberal Party support, the seat was made marginal with sitting member Nola Marino holding the seat on a 4.29 percent margin.

Notable members include Nelson Lemmon, a minister in the Chifley Government, Gordon Freeth, a minister in the Menzies, Holt and Gorton governments, and Geoff Prosser, a minister in the Howard government.

Members

Election results

References

External links
 Division of Forrest - Australian Electoral Commission

Electoral divisions of Australia
Constituencies established in 1922
1922 establishments in Australia
Federal politics in Western Australia